Dénes Berinkey (17 October 1871 – 25 June 1944) was a Hungarian jurist and politician who served as 21st Prime Minister of Hungary in the regime of Mihály Károlyi for two months in 1919.

On 20 March 1919 the French presented the Vix Note ordering Hungarian troops farther back into Hungary; it was widely assumed that the military lines would be the new frontiers. Berinkey was unwilling to accept the note, as it would have endangered the country's territorial integrity. He was in no position to reject it, however, and he his cabinet resigned.

President Károlyi then announced that only the Social Democrats could form a new government. Unknown to Károlyi, the Social Democrats had merged with the Communists. When Károlyi turned over power to what he thought was a Social Democratic government, he was actually swearing in a Communist one. The new government promptly proclaimed the Hungarian Soviet Republic.

References

External links
 Magyar Életrajzi Lexikon 
 Karl-Heinz Gräfe: Von der Asternrevolution zur Räterepublik. Ungarn 1918/19, in: UTOPIE kreativ, Oktober 2004, S. 885–900 
 Die Argumente der Gewalt (Ungarn 1918/19) 

1871 births
1944 deaths
People from Nové Zámky District
Hungarians in Slovakia
Prime Ministers of Hungary
Foreign ministers of Hungary
Justice ministers of Hungary
Burials at Farkasréti Cemetery